Bhadrotsav is another important festival of the Brahmos. The 6th of Bhadra 1234 B.E. (according to the Bengali calendar) or 20 August 1828 was the date when the doors of the first Brahmo Samaj were opened by Raja Rammohun Roy with his friend Tarachand Chakravarty as its first secretary. The Samaj initially functioned from a rented house belonging to Feranghee Kamal Bose and accommodated the first theistic congregation. To commemorate this historic event - Brahmos all over the world celebrate Bhadrotsav with divine service or prayers accompanied by devotional songs or Brahmasangeet.

It should also be noted that coincidentally or otherwise other Brahmo Samajees were also opened in this particular month of the year. On 22 August 1869 the consecration was held of the Brahmo Samaj of India or the Navavidhan Brahmo Samaj. The Brahmo Sammilan Samaj was also founded in August 1897.

The body of worshipers who used to assemble every week in the church consecrated by Rammohun were originally known as the Brahma Sabha and was later called the Calcutta Brahmo Samaj. It retained its name till 1866, the year of the first schism, after which it was changed to Adi or Original Brahmo Samaj to indicate its precedence in point of time to the younger branches.

The Brahmo religion stands for the following (as laid down in the Trust Deed of the Brahmo Samaj):

 Followers shall love Him and do His will and worship the One Absolute Prambrahma, the Creator, Preserver, Destroyer who is the giver of all Good in this world and the next, who is All knowing, All Pervading, Formless and Beneficent
 Followers shall not adore any created thing, thinking it to be the Supreme One
 Followers should perform good deeds - and it is through these good deeds one can serve God
 He is the One, Alone and Absolute - Ekamevadityam
 The Samaj is to be a meeting ground for all sects for the worship of the One True God
 No object of worship or a set of men shall be reviled or contemptuously spoken of or alluded to in any way
 No graven image statue or sculpture carving painting picture portrait or the likeness of anything shall be admitted within
 No object animate or inanimate that has been or is or shall hereafter become or be recognized as an object of worship
 No sacrifice offering oblation of any kind or thing shall ever be permitted
 Promote, charity, morality, piety, benevolence, virtue and strengthen the bonds of union between men of all religions and creed

For more details on the Maghotsav check out Brahmo Samaj Festivals
Sadharan Brahmo Samaj
Raja Rammohun Roy
Adi Brahmo Samaj

Brahmos
Hindu festivals
Religious festivals in India